General elections were held for the first time in Antigua and Barbuda on 26 July 1946. The elections were held under a limited franchise and only those who owned property were permitted to stand for election to the legislature. The Antigua Trades and Labour Union (ATLU) chose five of its members who satisfied the property criteria to stand as labour representatives. All were elected as the union-backed candidates received 82% of the vote.

One of the five was union leader and future Prime Minister of Antigua and Barbuda Vere Bird, who first entered the Antigua and Barbuda legislature through a by-election in 1945.

Results
The five union-backed candidates won their seats by large margins.

Aftermath
Following the elections, Bird was chosen by the Governor of Antigua to sit on the Executive Council of the colony.

References

Elections in Antigua and Barbuda
General
Antigua and Barbuda
Election and referendum articles with incomplete results
Landslide victories
Antigua